The 2003 Pontiac Excitement 400 was the 11th stock car race of the 2003 NASCAR Winston Cup Series season and the 49th iteration of the event. The race was held on Saturday, May 3, 2003, before a crowd of 110,000 in Richmond, Virginia, at Richmond International Raceway, a 0.75 miles (1.21 km) D-shaped oval. The race was shortened from its scheduled 400 laps to 393 due to rain cutting the race short. At race's end, Joe Nemechek, driving for Hendrick Motorsports, would rally from the mid-pack and eventually win his third career NASCAR Winston Cup Series win and his first and only win of the season. To fill out the podium, Bobby Labonte of Joe Gibbs Racing and Dale Earnhardt Jr. of Dale Earnhardt, Inc. would finish second and third, respectively.

MB2 Motorsports driver Jerry Nadeau would suffer career-ending injuries in the second practice session of the race.

Background

Entry list 

 (R) denotes rookie driver.

*Driver changed to Jason Keller after Nadeau crashed in second practice, leaving Nadeau critically injured and effectively ending Nadeau's racing career.

**Withdrew after crashing in first practice.

Practice

First practice 
The first practice session was held on Friday, May 2, at 11:20 AM EST, and would last for two hours.

Second practice 
The second practice session was held on Friday, May 2, at 4:45 PM EST, and would last for 45 minutes.

Third and final practice 
The third and final practice session, sometimes referred to as Happy Hour, was held on Friday, May 2, at 6:10 PM EST, and would last for 45 minutes.

Qualifying 
Qualifying was held on Friday, May 2, at 3:00 PM  EST. Each driver would have two laps to set a fastest time; the fastest of the two would count as their official qualifying lap. Positions 1-36 would be decided on time, while positions 37-43 would be based on provisionals. Six spots are awarded by the use of provisionals based on owner's points. The seventh is awarded to a past champion who has not otherwise qualified for the race. If no past champ needs the provisional, the next team in the owner points will be awarded a provisional.

Two drivers would fail to qualify: Derrike Cope and Hermie Sadler.

Full qualifying results

Race results

References 

2003 NASCAR Winston Cup Series
NASCAR races at Richmond Raceway
May 2003 sports events in the United States
2003 in sports in Virginia